Neosiccia is a genus of moths in the subfamily Arctiinae. It contains the single species Neosiccia accurata, which is found on Sumatra.

References

Natural History Museum Lepidoptera generic names catalog

Lithosiini